Jürgen Degen (born 7 November 1967) is a German former footballer who played as a forward. He made 19 appearances in the Bundesliga for 1. FC Kaiserslautern. He scored twice as Kaiserslautern won the 1991 DFB-Supercup Final.

Honours
 DFL-Supercup: 1991

References

External links

1967 births
Living people
German footballers
Footballers from Hamburg
Association football forwards
Bundesliga players
2. Bundesliga players
1. FC Kaiserslautern players
VfL 93 Hamburg players
Fortuna Düsseldorf players
Hannover 96 players
SV Meppen players
TuS Dassendorf players